Shelter Valley is a community in San Diego County in the U.S. state of California. It lies within the boundaries of the Anza-Borrego Desert State Park and the geologic feature known as Earthquake Valley. The Pacific Crest Trail passes along the northern boundary of the community.

The Anza Borrego Desert State Park acquired property to the north of the community in 1998, making Shelter Valley the second community (the first being nearby Borrego Springs) to be entirely surrounded by the park. The Sentenac Canyon and Cienega to the east of Scissors crossing were acquired in 1998. The state purchased parts of Rancho San Felipe to the west of Shelter Valley in 2004 that became part of the San Felipe Valley Wild Life Area and increased the contiguous extent of public lands surrounding the hamlet. In less than one year (2011 and 2012), multiple wildfires threatened the small community. The Banner Fire exited state park lands and entered the edge of the community, while the Vallecito Lightning Complex burned into the  San Felipe Valley (connecting valley to the north of Earthquake Valley) after menacing the nearby town of Ranchita. All were successfully contained by CAL FIRE and the Shelter Valley Volunteer Fire Dept through the San Diego County Fire Authority and no structures were lost. Improvements to the Shelter Valley fire station were completed in 2012 to provide better quarters for the volunteers that provide protection for the surrounding region.

Gallery

References

External links 
 Volunteer Fire Shelter Valley
 Fire at Shelter Valley
 Brush Fire Burning Near Julian Grows To 2,000 Acres, Evacuation Advisory Issued
 Banner fire evacuation lifted for RV park
 Borrego Springs Chamber & Visitors' Bureau

Unincorporated communities in San Diego County, California
Anza-Borrego Desert State Park
Unincorporated communities in California